Tell Sifr  is an ancient Near East archaeological site in Dhi Qar Governorate Iraq. It lies about nine miles from the ancient city of Larsa. The city lay on a branch of the ancient Iturungal canal.

History

The site was occupied in the Isin-Larsa and Old Babylonian periods. Larsa king Silli-Adad referred to himself as the governor of Kutalla. In one of his writings Hammurabi refers to an orchard keeper from Kutalla. A god, possibly the city god, known to reside at Kutallu was Lugal-ki-suna. A deified symbol of Marduk, Marru(m)-Ía-Marduk, the "Spade of Marduk" is also attested there. In Parthian times it was used as a cemetery. The Parthian graves are brick vaulted oblongs and painted red inside.

Archaeology

The site is a small conical mound on top of a platform of about 40 feet in height. It was excavated by William Loftus in 1854. A number of unbaked clay cuneiform tablets were found, many "enveloped". The tablets, 100 in total with most complete, were found in a brick structure, protected by reed matting. The envelopes partially surrounding the tablets were also inscribed and sealed using cylinder seals. An Old Babylonian period assemblage of copper tools was found.

The copper assemblage, which had also been wrapped in reed matting, and the tablets are now held at the British Museum. The tablets were later published. They were dated to the reigns of Larsa king Rim-Sin, and Babylon kings Hammurabi and Samsu-iluna. Most come from the family archive of one Sillii-Eshtar. After further analysis it has been suggested that one third of the tablets actually came from Ur (excavated by J.  E. Taylor) and were inadvertently mixed in with the Loftus tablets from Tell Sifr during shipping.

See also
Cities of the ancient Near East

References

Further reading
 R.Ward, TheFamily History of Silli-Ishtar: A Reconstruction based on the Kutalla Documents, University of Minnesota Unpublished PhD. Dissertation [Minneapolis, 1973

Archaeological sites in Iraq